Tripathi or Tripathy (Devanagari: त्रिपाठी) (Odia: ତ୍ରିପାଠୀ) (Tamil: திரிபாதி) is a Hindu Brahmin family name in India and Nepal. Trivedi and Tiwari are variants of the name.

Notable people
Notable people with this surname, who may or may not be affiliated to Brahmins, include:

Amish Tripathi, novelist
Anupam Tripathi, actor 
Bharat Tripathi, English cricketer
Bhumi Tripathi, Nepalese Politician
Braja Kishore Tripathy, Indian politician
Chittaranjan Tripathy, Odia director, music director and actor
D. P. Tripathi, politician from the Nationalist Congress Party
Deepak Tripathi, British historian
Divyanka Tripathi, model and actress
Govardhanram Tripathi, Indian Gujarati-language writer
Geeta Tripathee (born 1972) Nepalese poet, lyricist, essayist, literary critic and scholar
Hridayesh Tripathi, Nepalese politician
Kamalapati Tripathi, politician and former Chief Minister of Uttar Pradesh
Keshari Nath Tripathi, Bharatiya Janata Party politician and Governor of West Bengal
Kumud Tripathi, Bollywood actor
Kuna Tripathy, Indian actor
Lavanya Tripathi, model and actress working in Hindi, Telugu and Tamil films
Leslie Tripathy, Indian actress
Mansukhram Tripathi, Indian Gujarati-language writer
Pankaj Tripathi, Indian actor
Pravat Tripathy, Indian legislator
Rahul Tripathi, Indian first-class cricketer
Rakesh Kumar Tripathi, Hindi lyricist, screenwriter and director
Ramapati Ram Tripathi, Bharatiya Janata Party politician
Ravi K. Tripathi, Indian playback singer 
S. N. Tripathi, Indian composer
Sadashiva Tripathy, Indian politician
Sanjeev Tripathi, former chief of Research and Analysis Wing (RAW)
Shweta Tripathi, Indian actress
Sunny Tripathy, Indian-American actor
Sunil Tripathi (1990–2013), American student who was wrongly accused as the perpetrator of the Boston Marathon bombing
Surajsrikan Diwakar Mani Tripathi, Singaporean convicted murderer sentenced to life imprisonment and caning
Suryakant Tripathi 'Nirala', poet, novelist, essayist and story-writer
S Prakash Tiwari (born 1948), Indian biotechnologist, geneticist, agriculturalist and research director
Upendra Tripathy, IAS officer of Karnataka Cadre
Vani Tripathi, Indian actor and national secretary of the Bharatiya Janata Party

See also
Trivedi
Pandey

Indian surnames
Gujarati-language surnames
Bahun
Nepali-language surnames
Khas surnames